Movie Magic Screenwriter is a word processing program sold by Write Brothers to format screenplays, teleplays and novels.

History 
Stephen Greenfield and Chris Huntley created Scriptor, one of the earliest screenplay writing programs, that worked by converting wordprcessor documents into screenplay style. The program's importance was highlighted by an Academy Award for technical achievement in 1994. Scriptor later purchased ScriptThing, another screenwriting program, which was combined into Movie Magic Screenwriter. The program was considered an industry standard, along with Final Draft.

The Mac version of Screenwriter won a Macworld Editor's Choice Award for the year 2000. From 2003 to 2006, Screenwriter was the script-writing team's preferred tool on the popular BBC series Doctor Who.

See also
List of screenwriting software

References

External links 
 
 Write Brothers, Inc.

Screenwriting software
Classic Mac OS software
MacOS text-related software
Windows text-related software